Cuna de lobos (English: Cradle of wolves) is a Mexican telenovela produced by Carlos Téllez for Televisa, broadcast by El Canal de las Estrellas (now known simply as Las Estrellas). The series, about the struggle for power within a wealthy Mexican dynasty, was enormously popular in its native Mexico. It was also a hit in several foreign countries, including Brazil, the United States, Germany and Australia.

Starring Gonzalo Vega, Diana Bracho, Alejandro Camacho and Rebecca Jones.

Plot 
Years ago, when he was a little boy, José Carlos Larios (Gonzalo Vega) was playing with a wooden spinning top and, accidentally, he nailed it into his stepmother, Catalina Creel (María Rubio)'s, right eye, damaging it forever. As a result, she had to have it replaced with a glass eye and cover it with a patch for the rest of her life. José Carlos never managed to overcome the guilt he felt. That's how the story begins...

Catalina Creel has a secret. When her husband, Carlos Larios (Raúl Meraz), the head of the large-scale pharmaceutical company Lar-Creel, discovers it, he not only threatens to change his will but also to get a divorce from her. Realizing that she cannot keep concealing her deceit, Catalina poisons her husband's glass of orange juice that same morning before he leaves for work with a new drug the company received days before. Driving to work, the poison takes hold of Carlos, sending his car into the front office of a building on his way to work, killing him in the process.

Shocked and concerned for the man, one of the office's young employee's, Leonora Navarro (Diana Bracho), searches Carlos' body for identification. Finding a business card, she rings the offices of Lar-Creel and informs them of Carlos' "accident". As a result, Leonora meets Alejandro Larios (Alejandro Camacho), one of Carlos' two sons (the other one being José Carlos Larios).

At the reading of her husband's will, Catalina finds out that the empire they built together will be delivered in the hands of whichever of his two sons gives the family their next son and heir. The problem is that both of his sons have some difficulty in doing so, as José Carlos is uninterested in the family business and Alejandro's wife, Vilma (Rebecca Jones), is infertile. Although they would be able to adopt a child since no one in the family knows about Vilma's infertility, Alejandro desires a son of his own blood.

Thus, in secret, Alejandro begins to date Leonora with the plan of getting her pregnant and then taking the baby away from her and passing it off as his and Vilma's child. Meanwhile, Vilma begins to wear pillows underneath her clothes to give the appearance that she is expecting a baby, much to the curiosity of Catalina. Not to be outsmarted, Catalina travels to New York to confirm her suspicions that there is no way that Vilma could bear a child and later invites Vilma to talk about it in front of her false gynaecologist. Eyeing her surroundings, Catalina picks up a poker from the fireplace, thrusting it into Vilma's belly, puncturing the pillow she was wearing and uncovering the lie in true Catalina Creel style.

Meanwhile, Alejandro and Leonora marry and Leonora becomes pregnant, as Catalina learns of her favoured son's scheme to bring the new heir to the family. In the midst of all this, Catalina continues to eliminate anyone that stands in her way and that threatens to reveal the secret she holds.

Leonora gives birth to "Little Édgar", the Larios' heir, who is immediately snatched away from her and delivered to the care of Alejandro and Vilma. Hours later, upon regaining consciousness, Leonora quickly becomes wise to the situation and escapes from the clinic, pleading with a gas station attendant for help and a ride back to Mexico City.

One year later, on Édgar's first birthday, we see a defiant and stronger-than-ever Leonora vowing to take her due revenge on Alejandro and Catalina and regain her son. As part of her own scheme, she approaches José Carlos, Alejandro's brother, managing to make him fall in love with her and, after a short while, they marry. Upon returning to Mexico City and much to the shock of the Larios' mansion residents, Leonora moves into their home along with her godmother and her husband by her side.

Cast

Awards and nominations

Legacy 
The central character in Cuna de lobos is Leonora Navarro, played by Diana Bracho, who portrays the victim of the "wolves", only to "become" a "wolf" herself to seek revenge.

The main antagonist is matriarch Catalina Creel, played by actress María Rubio, a villain in the grand dramatic tradition of Dynasty's Alexis Carrington, Dallas' J. R. Ewing, or Knots Landing's Abby Cunningham.

Catalina's unnatural devotion to her only son caused her to conceal a healthy eye behind the lie of blindness, commit a series of murders, beginning with that of her own husband, Carlos, (his mistake was realizing how evil she truly was) and to participate in the abduction of a child to ensure an inheritance.

Such was the impact of her performance that most soap opera villains take her as a role model and, when a program parodies a soap opera, the main villain is usually based on her.

Cuna de lobos was so popular in its native country that, on the night of the final broadcast, the streets of Mexico City (infamously choked with traffic) were deserted, as the locals were in their homes glued to their TV screens. It has been re-screened several times in the United States and Australia in recent years. A remake has been in talks for several years, with one finally surfacing in 2019.

DVD
The first DVD of Cuna de lobos came out in 2002. It was a single-disc DVD that contained the entire telenovela edited down to a little over 230 minutes. A second DVD release came on March 8, 2006. While it expanded the telenovela to over 11 hours played on three DVDs, the original instrumental music and soundtrack had been erased and substituted by new music. According to Televisa, this was due to a disagreement with Mexican actress and producer Carmen Salinas, who used to own the music rights after her deceased son Pedro Plascencia Salinas, producer of the music of the telenovela.

References

External links 

Cuna de Lobos
Beyond soap - BBC embraces villains, plot twists and Latin style of telenovela at The Guardian contains a significant mention of Cuna de Lobos

1986 telenovelas
Mexican telenovelas
1986 Mexican television series debuts
1987 Mexican television series endings
Spanish-language telenovelas
Television shows set in Mexico
Televisa telenovelas